Artur Maxhuni (born 27 October 1972) is an Albanian former professional footballer who played as a forward in the 2. Bundesliga for SV Wehen Wiesbaden, FC St. Pauli, Darmstadt 98 and SC Concordia Hamburg.

International career
Maxhuni made his debut for Albania as a late substitute for Arjan Peço in a September 1998 European Championship qualification match against Georgia, which remained his sole cap.

References

External links

1972 births
Living people
Footballers from Kavajë
Albanian footballers
Association football forwards
Albania international footballers
2. Bundesliga players
Besa Kavajë players
KF Tirana players
SV Wehen Wiesbaden players
FC St. Pauli players
SV Darmstadt 98 players
SC Concordia von 1907 players
VfL 93 Hamburg players
Albanian expatriate footballers
Albanian expatriate sportspeople in Germany
Expatriate footballers in Germany